Canadian National 6218 is a 4-8-4 U-2-g Confederation built by the Montreal Locomotive Works (MLW) in 1942 for the Canadian National Railway. It became famous after it was brought back by CN for their Steam Excursion Program from 1964 to 1971. It is now on static display at the Fort Erie Railway Museum in Fort Erie, Ontario.

History

Revenue service
Built By the Montreal Locomotive Works (MLW) in September 1942, No. 6218 was designed for pulling mainline passenger trains between Winnipeg and Halifax, Nova Scotia for the Canadian National Railway (CN). The locomotive was one of 65 U-2-g/h “Confederation” locomotives that were built during in the early-mid 1940s during World War II. 6218 was eventually reassigned to pull freight and mail trains after diesels took over the high-priority passenger trains. After a mostly uneventful career with CN, 6218 was retired in 1960, after CN made a complete transition to diesel power.

Excursion service
After being retired, 6218 was put into storage inside a roundhouse. In 1964, No. 6218 was selected by CN to be used on their steam excursion program as a replacement for their previous locomotive, U-2-e class 4-8-4 6167. The 6218 was overhauled in the Stratford, Ontario shops in November 1963, before the shops subsequently closed for good. The 6218 was brought back under steam in 1964, and in September that year, it performed a Double header with 6167 shortly before that engine’s retirement. For the rest of the 1964 operational season, 6218 pulled fall-foliage trains sponsored by the Canadian Railroad Historical Association (CRHA). The engine spent the next seven years famously pulling several excursion runs between Montreal, Ontario, and many other cities. During the rest of the engine’s new lease on life, the 6218 would have its smoke deflectors removed and reinstalled frequently. The locomotive became even more famous in November 1968, when it pulled a few excursions on the Grand Trunk Western between Chicago, Illinois and South Bend, Indiana, sponsored by the Illinois Railroad Club. As the constant boiler extensions for the 6218 continued to become shorter, though, CN decided to operate the final excursion trips to usher out what appeared to be end of their steam fantrip program. In 1970, the 6218 pulled a series of fan trips that were dubbed “Countdown 6218”, as orchestrated by the Montreal-based St Lawrence Region Department of Public Relations. On July 3rd and 4th, 1971, the 6218 performed its final runs between Belleville and Anson Junction. After the final runs ended, No. 6218 was retired by CN, and it became replaced on the fantrip program by U-1-f 4-8-2 No. 6060.

Disposion
After its retirement from excursion service, 6218 was put into storage. In 1972, the locomotive was donated to the Fort Erie Railway Museum in Fort Erie, Ontario, along with a Caboose.  A second restoration was considered in 2010, but the cost was estimated to be around $429,000 at the time. Another restoration possibility was considered in 2017, as it was within several options that were explored to change the locomotive’s future. However, the Fort Erie city council chose to keep the locomotive at the museum, and a cosmetic restoration would be performed, instead. The locomotive remains on static display at the museum today.

See also
Canadian National 6213
Confederation locomotive
Grand Trunk Western 6325
Grand Trunk Western 6323
Canadian National 6060
Canadian National 6077
Union Pacific 844
Chicago, Burlington and Quincy 5632
Norfolk and Western 611

References 

Canadian National Railway
6218
4-8-4 locomotives
Steam locomotives of Canada
Preserved steam locomotives of Canada
Individual locomotives of Canada